HMS Valiant was a 70-gun third rate ship of the line of the Royal Navy, modelled on the captured French ship Invincible and launched on 1 August 1759 at Chatham Dockyard. Her construction, launch and fitting-out are the theme of the 'Wooden Walls' visitor experience at Chatham Historic Dockyard. She served under Augustus Keppel during the Seven Years' War, and was with him at the Capture of Havana, in 1763.

She took part in the action of 4 January 1781.

In 1782 she was under George Rodney at the Battle of the Saintes.

Valiant also served under  Admiral Prince William in 1789 and fought at the Glorious First of June in 1794. In 1798 she captured the French privateer corvette Magicienne. In 1799 she was placed on harbour service, and was eventually broken up in 1827.

Notes

References

 Lavery, Brian (2003) The Ship of the Line - Volume 1: The development of the battlefleet 1650-1850. Conway Maritime Press. .

External links
 

Ships of the line of the Royal Navy
Valiant-class ships of the line
Ships built in Chatham
1759 ships